KZRV (96.7 FM, "96-7 The River") is a radio station in St. Cloud, Minnesota licensed to Sartell, Minnesota by the Federal Communications Commission (FCC), airing a classic hits format. The station is owned by Townsquare Media. The station's studios, along with Townsquare's other St. Cloud stations, are located at 640 Lincoln Avenue SE, on St. Cloud's east side.

History

Star 96.7/KISS 96
The station aired a contemporary hit radio (Top 40) format as "Kiss 96" (KKSR) from July 2000 until September 2007, and a light AC (lite) format known as "Star 96.7" from its sign-on in 1988 to July 2000.

Rev 96-7
In 2007, KKSR changed to an Active Rock format known as "Rev 96-7" along  with changing the call letters to KZRV to match the Rev branding.

96.7 The River (Current Format)
On June 27, 2017 at Midnight, KZRV flipped to classic hits, branded as "96.7 The River".

External links
96.7 The River official website

Radio stations in St. Cloud, Minnesota
Classic hits radio stations in the United States
Radio stations established in 2000
Townsquare Media radio stations